German Barkovskiy (born 25 June 2002) is a Belarusian professional footballer who plays for Energetik-BGU Minsk.

References

External links 
 
 

2002 births
Living people
People from Babruysk
Sportspeople from Mogilev Region
Belarusian footballers
Association football forwards
FC Belshina Bobruisk players
FC Rukh Brest players
FC Isloch Minsk Raion players
FC Energetik-BGU Minsk players